Rynier Mark Bernardo (born 27 August 1991) is a South African rugby union player who currently plays as a lock for the Free State Cheetahs in the South African Currie Cup.

Playing career

Youth

Bernardo represented  at various youth tournaments. In 2007, he played at the Under-16 Grant Khomo Week. The following year, he played for them at the Under-18 Academy week, resulting in his inclusion in the S.A. Schools Academy team in the same year. He also played at the 2009 Under-18 Craven Week tournament.

Eastern Province Kings

Bernardo was included in the senior squad for the 2012 Vodacom Cup competition and made his first class debut during that competition, coming on as a third-minute substitute in their match against near neighbours .

Southern Kings

Bernardo was named in the  squad for the 2013 Super Rugby season. He didn't play in the first three matches of the season, being behind David Bulbring, Steven Sykes and Daniel Adongo in the pecking order.

Three more substitute appearances followed, bringing his tally to ten matches in total. The return to fitness of Darron Nell at the end of the season saw him revert to the  side playing in the 2013 Vodacom Cup and 2013 Currie Cup First Division competitions.

Cheetahs

However, he was not named in their final squad and returned to Port Elizabeth.

Ospreys

In April 2014, it was announced that Bernardo joined Welsh Pro12 side Ospreys on a deal until 2017. Bernardo suffered a dislocated kneecap during the 2015–16 season and was ruled out for the rest of the season.

Scarlets

In June 2016, Bernardo joined another Welsh Pro12 side, Scarlets.

Free State Cheetahs

Canon Eagles

Bernardo joined Canon Eagles prior to the 2018–19 Top League season.

References

South African rugby union players
Eastern Province Elephants players
Southern Kings players
Rugby union players from Pretoria
Living people
1991 births
Ospreys (rugby union) players
Scarlets players
Free State Cheetahs players
Cheetahs (rugby union) players
Yokohama Canon Eagles players
Rugby union locks